Sports on Amazon Prime Video, sometimes called Prime Video Sports outside the United States, is the branding used for sports telecasts on Amazon Prime Video.

History
In November 2016, the Wall Street Journal first reported that Amazon was pursuing streaming rights to U.S. professional sports leagues to further differentiate the service.

In April 2017, Amazon began to make sports-related content acquisitions, first acquiring non-exclusive rights to stream portions of the NFL's Thursday Night Football games during the 2017 NFL season to Prime subscribers in a $50 million deal, replacing a previous deal with Twitter. In August, Amazon acquired the British television rights to the ATP World Tour beginning 2019, replacing Sky Sports. The deal will run until 2023 and will exclusively show all masters 1000 events and 12 500 and 250 series tournaments. Amazon will be the third party pay TV provider for the ATP finals and starting in 2018 for Queens Club and Eastbourne tournaments. The ATP announced a two-year deal in September for Amazon to stream the Next Generation ATP Finals. In November it was announced that Amazon had acquired the British television rights to the US Open for five years from the 2018 edition, for a reported £30 million. Eurosport who owned the pan European rights extended their deal with the US Open but excluded the UK, which was ironic as Amazon had reached a deal with the broadcaster to stream their channels on their station. The ATP additionally announced that Amazon in the US would screen the tennis channel, Tennis TV from 2018.

In June 2018, it was announced that Amazon had secured the UK rights to broadcast 20 live Premier League football matches from the 2019–20 season on a three-year deal. This will be the first time that the league will be shown on a domestic live streaming service, as opposed to being shown exclusively on television. The deal has since been extended for a further three years until the 2024–25 season.

On June 12, 2019, the WTA announced that Amazon Prime Video had signed a four-year deal for a minimum of 49 WTA tournaments in the UK.

On December 11, 2019, Prime Video announced they had acquired the rights to Tuesday evening UEFA Champions League matches in Germany in three seasons until 2024 starting with the 2021-22 season.

On August 18, 2020, Seattle Sounders FC announced that Amazon Prime Video had become the streaming partner for all non-nationally televised matches. These matches would continue to air on KCPQ and KZJO in the Seattle area.

On October 14, 2020, the French Open announced the creation of 10 new night sessions. Amazon Prime Video will broadcast these sessions exclusively.

On December 18, 2020, Prime Video announced they had acquired the rights to 16 Wednesday evening UEFA Champions League matches up to the semi-finals in Italy, as well as the UEFA Super Cup.

On March 18, 2021, Prime Video announced that they have renewed their deal to and will be the exclusive broadcaster of Thursday Night Football between the 2022 and 2033 seasons. Because Prime Video is a subscription service, the NFL will require Amazon to have the games syndicated to over-the-air television stations in the local market of the teams.

On June 11, 2021, Amazon acquired the rights to 80% of Ligue 1 matches in France, alongside a Sunday highlight show.

Beginning with the 2021 Major League Baseball season, select New York Yankees games airing on WPIX were also simulcast on Prime Video. These games were only available in the Yankees home television market. Beginning with the 2022 Major League Baseball season, these telecasts became exclusive to Prime Video. However, due to Aaron Judge's popularity and to avoid the outcry of the New York State Attorney General, Amazon agreed to simulcast the final game of its 21-game package on the YES Network for those without Prime Video access.

On May 12, 2021, the WNBA announced that Amazon Prime had acquired the global rights to 17 WNBA games per season.

On April 21, 2022, the Seattle Storm announced that 30 games would stream exclusively on Amazon Prime throughout Washington state.

Channels
Prime Video also offers several "channels" for live sports. These channels are separate, non Amazon subscription services, which add a cost on top of Amazon Prime, but, when purchased, can be accessed through Amazon Prime.

In the United States the channels include, MLB.TV, NBA League Pass (which includes NBA TV), Paramount+ (which includes select sporting events from CBS Sports), PGA Tour Live, Motortrend, MOTV, FuelTV and The Surf Network.

In the United Kingdom the channels include, Premier Sports, Discovery+ Sport, and La Liga TV.

In France the channels include, Golf Channel and Le Pass Ligue 1.

Current rights

United States
National Football League 
Thursday Night Football (2017–present)
NFL Playoffs (2021–present)
1 preseason game (2022–present)
Major League Baseball 
Select New York Yankees games in home market only (2021–present)
Women's National Basketball Association
17 exclusive national regular season games (2021–present)
30 regular season Seattle Storm games in Washington state only.
ONE Championship
ONE on Prime Video mixed martial arts and muay Thai events (2022–present)

United Kingdom
Next Generation ATP Finals (2018–present)
ATP World Tour
Third party pay TV provider for Queens Club and Eastbourne tournament (2018–present)
All Masters 1000 events (2019–present)
Twelve 500 and 250 series tournaments (2019–present)
Third party pay TV provider for the ATP finals (2019–present)
Premier League 
20 matches (2019–present)
WTA Tour
49 tournaments (2020–present)

Brazil
 Copa do Brasil (2022-2026)  
Sub-licensed from Grupo Globo
Circa 50 matches per season
Exclusive matches from 1st round until quarter-finals
Semi-finals and final shown, but also shared with SporTV and TV Globo
 NBA (2022-2023)

France
Ligue 1 (2021–24)
8 matches per week
10 top pick matches and 66 second and third pick matches per season
Sunday highlight show
French Open (2021–23)
10 night sessions

Germany
UEFA Champions League (2021–24)
Tuesday evening matches up to the semifinals

Italy
UEFA Champions League
16 Wednesday evening matches up to the semifinals
UEFA Super Cup

References

Amazon Prime Video original programming